Demis Hassabis  (born 27 July 1976) is a British artificial intelligence researcher and entrepreneur. In his early career he was a video game AI programmer and designer, and an expert board games player. He is the chief executive officer and co-founder of DeepMind and Isomorphic Labs, and a UK Government AI Advisor.

Early life and education
Hassabis was born to a Greek Cypriot father and a Chinese Singaporean mother and grew up in North London. A child prodigy in chess from the age of 4, Hassabis reached master standard at the age of 13 with an Elo rating of 2300 and captained many of the England junior chess teams. He represented the University of Cambridge in the Oxford-Cambridge varsity chess matches of 1995, 1996 and 1997, winning a half blue.

Hassabis was briefly home-schooled by his parents, during which time he bought his first computer, a ZX Spectrum 48K funded from chess winnings, and taught himself how to program from books. He went on to be educated at Christ's College, Finchley, a state-funded comprehensive school in East Finchley, North London. He completed his A-levels and scholarship level exams two years early at the ages of 15 and 16 respectively.

Bullfrog
Asked by Cambridge University to take a gap year due to his young age, Hassabis began his computer games career at Bullfrog Productions, first-level designing on Syndicate, and then at 17 co-designing and lead programming on the 1994 game Theme Park, with the games designer Peter Molyneux. Theme Park, a simulation video game, sold over ten million copies and won a Golden Joystick Award, and inspired a whole genre of simulation sandbox games. He earned enough from his gap year to pay his own way through university.

University of Cambridge
Hassabis then left Bullfrog to study at Queens' College, Cambridge, where he completed the Computer Science Tripos and graduated in 1997 with a Double First from the University of Cambridge.

Career and research

Lionhead
After graduating from Cambridge, Hassabis worked at Lionhead Studios. Games designer Peter Molyneux, with whom Hassabis had worked at Bullfrog Productions, had recently founded the company. At Lionhead, Hassabis worked as lead AI programmer on the 2001 "god" game Black & White.

Elixir Studios
Hassabis left Lionhead in 1998 to found Elixir Studios, a London-based independent games developer, signing publishing deals with Eidos Interactive, Vivendi Universal and Microsoft. In addition to managing the company, Hassabis served as executive designer of the BAFTA-nominated games Republic: The Revolution and Evil Genius.

The release of Elixir's first game, Republic: The Revolution, a highly ambitious and unusual political simulation game, was delayed due to its huge scope, which involved an AI simulation of the workings of an entire fictional country. The final game was reduced from its original vision and greeted with lukewarm reviews, receiving a Metacritic score of 62/100. Evil Genius, a tongue-in-cheek Bond villain simulator, fared much better with a score of 75/100. In April 2005 the intellectual property and technology rights were sold to various publishers and the studio was closed.

Neuroscience research at University College London

Following Elixir Studios, Hassabis returned to academia to obtain his PhD in cognitive neuroscience from University College London (UCL) in 2009 supervised by Eleanor Maguire. He sought to find inspiration in the human brain for new AI algorithms.

He continued his neuroscience and artificial intelligence research as a visiting scientist jointly at Massachusetts Institute of Technology (MIT), in the lab of Tomaso Poggio, and Harvard University, before earning a Henry Wellcome postdoctoral research fellowship to the Gatsby Computational Neuroscience Unit at UCL in 2009 working with Peter Dayan.

Working in the field of imagination, memory and amnesia, he co-authored several influential papers published in Nature, Science, Neuron and PNAS. His very first academic work, published in PNAS, was a landmark paper that showed systematically for the first time that patients with damage to their hippocampus, known to cause amnesia, were also unable to imagine themselves in new experiences. The finding established a link between the constructive process of imagination and the reconstructive process of episodic memory recall. Based on this work and a follow-up functional magnetic resonance imaging (fMRI) study, Hassabis developed a new theoretical account of the episodic memory system identifying scene construction, the generation and online maintenance of a complex and coherent scene, as a key process underlying both memory recall and imagination. This work received widespread coverage in the mainstream media and was listed in the top 10 scientific breakthroughs of the year by the journal Science. He later generalised these ideas to advance the notion of a 'simulation engine of the mind' whose role it was to imagine events and scenarios to aid with better planning.

DeepMind
Hassabis is the CEO and co-founder of DeepMind, a machine learning AI startup, founded in London in 2010 with Shane Legg and Mustafa Suleyman. Hassabis met Legg when both were postdocs at the Gatsby Computational Neuroscience Unit, and he and Suleyman had been friends through family. Hassabis also recruited his university friend and Elixir partner David Silver.

DeepMind's mission is to "solve intelligence" and then use intelligence "to solve everything else". More concretely, DeepMind aims to combine insights from systems neuroscience with new developments in machine learning and computing hardware to unlock increasingly powerful general-purpose learning algorithms that will work towards the creation of an artificial general intelligence (AGI). The company has focused on training learning algorithms to master games, and in December 2013 it announced that it had made a pioneering breakthrough by training an algorithm called a Deep Q-Network (DQN) to play Atari games at a superhuman level by only using the raw pixels on the screen as inputs.

DeepMind's early investors included several high-profile tech entrepreneurs. In 2014, Google purchased DeepMind for £400 million. Although most of the company has remained an independent entity based in London, DeepMind Health has since been directly incorporated into Google Health.
 
Since the Google acquisition, the company has notched up a number of significant achievements, perhaps the most notable being the creation of AlphaGo, a program that defeated world champion Lee Sedol at the complex game of Go. Go had been considered a holy grail of AI, for its high number of possible board positions and resistance to existing programming techniques. However, AlphaGo beat European champion Fan Hui 5-0 in October 2015 before winning 4-1 against former world champion Lee Sedol in March 2016. Additional DeepMind accomplishments include creating a Neural Turing Machine, reducing the energy used by the cooling systems in Google's data centers by 40%, advancing research on AI safety, and the creation of a partnership with the National Health Service (NHS) of the United Kingdom and Moorfields Eye Hospital to improve medical service and identify the onset of degenerative eye conditions.

More recently, DeepMind turned its artificial intelligence to protein folding, a 50-year grand challenge in science, to predict the 3D structure of a protein from its 1D amino acid sequence. This is an important problem in biology, as proteins are essential to life, almost every biological function depends on them, and the function of a protein is thought to be related to its structure. In December 2018, DeepMind's tool AlphaFold won the 13th Critical Assessment of Techniques for Protein Structure Prediction (CASP) by successfully predicting the most accurate structure for 25 out of 43 proteins. "This is a lighthouse project, our first major investment in terms of people and resources into a fundamental, very important, real-world scientific problem", Hassabis said to The Guardian. In November 2020, DeepMind again announced world-beating results in the CASP14 edition of the competition, with a median global distance test (GDT) score of 87.0 across protein targets in the challenging free-modeling category, much higher than the same 2018 results with a median GDT < 60, and an overall error of less than the width of an atom, making it competitive with experimental methods.

DeepMind has also been responsible for technical advancements in machine learning, having produced a number of award-winning papers. In particular, the company has made significant advances in deep learning and reinforcement learning, and pioneered the field of deep reinforcement learning which combines these two methods. Hassabis has predicted that Artificial Intelligence will be "one of the most beneficial technologies of mankind ever" but that significant ethical issues remain.

Personal life
Hassabis lives in London, and is a lifelong supporter of Liverpool FC.

Awards and honours
Entrepreneurial and scientific
 2023 - Breakthrough Prize in Life Sciences for developing AlphaFold, which accurately predicts the structure of protein
 2022 - Global Swiss AI Award for outstanding achievements in AI
 2022 - BBVA Foundation Frontiers of Knowledge Award in the category "Biology and Biomedicine".
 2022 - Princess of Asturias Award (with Yoshua Bengio, Geoffrey Hinton, and Yann LeCun) for Technical and Scientific Research
 2022 - Wiley Prize in Biomedical Sciences
 2021 - IRI Medal, established by the Industrial Research Institute (IRI)
 2021 - International Honorary Member of the American Academy of Arts and Sciences
 2020 - Pius XI Medal from the Pontifical Academy of Sciences
 2020 - The 50 most influential people in Britain from British GQ magazine
 2020 - Dan David Prize - Future Award
 2019 - Winner of UKtech50 (the 50 most influential people in UK technology) from Computer Weekly
 2018 - Elected a Fellow of the Royal Society (FRS) in May 2018
 2018 - Adviser to the UK's Government Office for Artificial Intelligence
 2018 - Honorary Doctorate, Imperial College London
 2017 - Appointed Commander of the Order of the British Empire (CBE) in the 2018 New Year Honours for "services to Science and Technology".
 2017 - Time 100: The 100 Most Influential People
 2017 - The Asian Awards: Outstanding Achievement in Science and Technology
 2017 - Elected a Fellow of the Royal Academy of Engineering (FREng)
 2017 - American Academy of Achievement: Golden Plate Award
 2016 - Honorary Fellow, University College London
 2016 - London Evening Standard list of influential Londoners, number 6
 2016 - Royal Academy of Engineering Silver Medal
 2016 - WIRED Leadership in Innovation
 2016 - Nature's "top ten scientists of the year"
 2016 - Financial Times Digital Entrepreneur of the Year
 2015 - Financial Times top 50 Entrepreneurs in Europe
 2015 - Fellow Benefactor, Queens' College, Cambridge
 2014 - Third most influential Londoner according to the London Evening Standard 2014 - Mullard Award of the Royal Society
 2013 - Listed on WIRED's 'Smart 50'
 2009 - Fellow of the Royal Society of Arts (FRSA)

 Research 
Hassabis's research work has been listed in the Top 10 Scientific Breakthroughs of the Year by Science Magazine on four separate occasions:
 2021 Breakthrough of the Year (Winner) - for AlphaFold v2
 2020 Breakthrough of the Year (Top 10) - for AlphaFold v1
 2016 Breakthrough of the Year (Top 10) - for AlphaGo
2007 Breakthrough of the Year (Top 10) - for neuroscience research on imagination

DeepMind
 Cambridge Computer Laboratory Company of the Year (2014)
 Six Nature front cover articles (2015, 2016, 2019, 2020, and two in 2021) and one Science'' front cover article (2017)
 Honorary 9-dan Go rank for AlphaGo from Korean Baduk Association (2016) and Chinese Weiqi Association (2017)
 Cannes Lion Grand Prix for AlphaGo (2016)
 WIRED Innovation in AI Award (2016)
 City AM Innovative Company of the Year (2016)

Games
Hassabis is a five-times winner of the all-round world board games championship (the Pentamind), and an expert player of many games including:
 Chess: achieved Master standard at age 13 with ELO rating of 2300 (at the time the second-highest in the world for his age after Judit Polgar).
 Diplomacy: World Team Champion in 2004, 4th in 2006 World Championship, 3rd in 2004 European Championship.
 Poker: cashed at the World Series of Poker six times including in the Main Event.
 Multi-games events at the London Mind Sports Olympiad: World Pentamind Champion (a record five times: 1998, 1999, 2000, 2001, 2003) and World Decamentathlon Champion (twice: 2003, 2004).

References

External links

 

1976 births
Living people
Academics of University College London
Alumni of Queens' College, Cambridge
Alumni of University College London
Artificial intelligence researchers
British chess players
British computer programmers
British people of Greek Cypriot descent
British people of Chinese descent
British people of Singaporean descent
British video game designers
British video game programmers
Bullfrog Productions
Commanders of the Order of the British Empire
Fellows of the Royal Academy of Engineering
Fellows of the Royal Society
Lionhead Studios
Machine learning researchers
People educated at Christ's College, Finchley